António Joaquim Granjo  (27 December 1881 – 19 October 1921) was a Portuguese lawyer and politician who served twice as prime minister during 1920 and 1921, until his assassination.

Biography

Granjo was born in Chaves.Already a committed republican from his youth, well before the 1910 overthrow of the monarchy, he became a member of the National Constituent Assembly, elected on 28 May 1911. He gave up his constituency in order to join the army; during Portuguese participation in World War I, he saw combat himself, and upon returning home he wrote a book about his battle experiences.

After President Sidónio Pais was shot dead, Granjo took action against the Monarchy of the North, an attempt to restore a royalist regime in the north of Portugal, in 1919. He was President of the Municipal Chamber of Chaves, from February to July 1919. That same year he was elected to the Chamber of Deputies, by the Evolutionist Party, later being a founder of its successor movement, the Republican Liberal Party. Minister of Justice during Domingos Pereira's coalition government, he served two brief terms as Prime Minister, the first time, from 19 July to 20 November 1920, in a liberal government. Afterwards he was nominated Prime Minister again, to take the place of another liberal, Tomé de Barros Queirós, on 30 August 1921.

Assassination

During the infamous "Bloody Night" in Lisbon, on 19 October 1921, Granjo was assassinated. The political affiliation of his murderers' instigators is still a matter of dispute. That same night, two other prominent republicans of moderately right-wing sympathies, António Machado Santos (widely known as the founder of the republic) and José Carlos da Maia, also died.

Distinctions

National orders
 Officer of the Military Order of Aviz (24 June 1919)

References

1881 births
1921 deaths
People from Chaves, Portugal
Evolutionist Party politicians
Republican Liberal Party (Portugal) politicians
Prime Ministers of Portugal
Finance ministers of Portugal
Government ministers of Portugal
20th-century Portuguese lawyers
Assassinated Portuguese politicians
People murdered in Portugal
Deaths by firearm in Portugal
1921 murders in Portugal
Officers of the Order of Aviz